Tvoje lice zvuči poznato is the fourth season of the Serbian talent show Tvoje lice zvuči poznato, based on the global franchise Your Face Sounds Familiar. It aired between October 1 and December 17, 2017. The main judging panel consisted of actors and comedians Andrija Milošević and Branko Đurić, who returned after the second season, and singer Aleksandra Radović. Previous judge from series one and two, Marija Mihajlović, also returned as the vocal coach, working with the contestants alongside Radović. American-Serbian actor and model, Nina Seničar, served as the host. The series was won by singer Stevan Anđelković.

Format
The show challenges celebrities (singers and actors) to perform as different iconic music artists every week, which are chosen by the show's "Randomiser". They are then judged by the panel of celebrity judges including Branko Đurić, Aleksandra Radović and Andrija Milošević. Each week, one celebrity guest judge joins Branko, Aleksandra and Andrija to make up the complete judging panel. Each celebrity gets transformed into a different singer each week, and performs an iconic song and dance routine well known by that particular singer. The 'randomiser' can choose any older or younger artist available in the machine, or even a singer of the opposite sex, or a deceased singer. Winner of each episode wins €1000, and winner of whole show wins €25000. All money goes to charity of winner's own choice. The show lasts 12 weeks.

Voting
The contestants are awarded points from the judges (and each other) based on their singing, Acting and dance routines. Judges give points from 2 to 12, with the exception of 11. After that, each contestant gives 5 points to a fellow contestant of their choice (known as "Bonus" points). In week 11 (semi-final week) and in week 12 (final week), viewers also vote via text messages. In week 11 (semi-final), all judges points from past weeks and from semi-final are made into points from 2 to 12 (without 11). Contestants with most judges points will get 12 points, second placed will get 10, third placed 9 and 10th placed will get only 2 points. After that, public votes will also be made into points from 2 to 12, again with the exception of 11. Contestant with most public votes will get 12 points, second placed 10 and 10th placed will get only 2. All those points will be summed up and five contestants with most points will go to final week. In final week, judges will not vote - contestant with most public vote will win the show.

Contestants

Week 1
Guest Judge: Hristina Popović   Aired: October 1, 2017  Winner: Bebi Dol

Bonus points
 Stevan gave five points to Bebi Dol
 Tijana gave five points to Edita Aradinović
 Edita gave five points to Bebi Dol
 Bane Vidaković gave five points to Dragana Mićalović
 Mira gave five points to Bane Vidaković
 Leon gave five points to Edita Aradinović
 Pagonis gave five points to Dragana Micalovic
 Bebi Dol five points to Tijana Dapčević
 Dragana Micalovic gave five points to Bane Vidaković
 Bane Lečić gave five points to Bebi Dol

Week 2
Guest Judge: Dragan Brajović Braja   Aired: October 8, 2017  Winner: Tijana Dapčević

Bonus points
 Stevan gave five points to Nenad Pagonis
 Tijana gave five points to Stevan Anđelković
 Edita gave five points to Tijana Dapčević
 Bane gave five points to Tijana Dapčević
 Mira gave five points to Nenad Pagonis
 Leon gave five points to Tijana Dapčević
 Pagonis gave five points to Stefan Dimitrijević Leon
 Bebi Dol five points to Dragana Mićalović
 Dragana Mićalović gave five points to Stevan Anđelković
 Bane Lečić gave five points to Nenad Pagonis

Week 3
Guest Judge: Dušan Ivković   Aired: October 15, 2017  Winner: Edita Aradinović

Bonus points
 Mira Škorić gave five points to Stevan Anđelković
 Dragana Mićalović gave five points to Edita Aradinović
 Stevan Anđelković gave five points to Edita Aradinović
 Leon gave five points to Tijana Dapčević
 Tijana Dapčević gave five points to Edita Aradinović
 Bebi Dol gave five points to Edita Aradinović
 Bane Vidaković gave five points to Bebi Dol
 Nenad Pagonis five points to Branislav Lečić
 Branislav Lečić gave five points to Edita Aradinović
 Edita Aradinović gave five points to Mira Škorić

Week 4
Guest Judge: Jelena Karleuša   Aired: October 22, 2017  Winner: Dragana Mićalović

Bonus points
 Mira Škorić gave five points to Dragana Mičalović
 Dragana Mićalović gave five points to Leon
 Stevan Anđelković gave five points to Leon
 Leon gave five points to Edita Aradinović
 Tijana Dapčević gave five points to Dragana Mićalović
 Bebi Dol gave five points to Branislav Lečić
 Bane Vidaković gave five points to Dragana Mićalović
 Nenad Pagonis five points to Dragana Mićalović
 Branislav Lečić gave five points to Dragana Mićalović
 Edita Aradinović gave five points to Leon

Week 5
Guest Judge: Ana Kokić   Aired: October 29, 2017  Winner: Nenad Pagonis

Bonus points
 Mira Škorić gave five points to Branislav Lečić
 Dragana Mićalović gave five points to Branislav Lečić
 Stevan Anđelković gave five points to Bane Vidaković
 Leon gave five points to Nenad Pagonis
 Tijana Dapčević gave five points to Branislav Lečić
 Bebi Dol gave five points to Bane Vidaković
 Bane Vidaković gave five points to Branislav Lečić
 Nenad Pagonis five points to Bane Vidaković
 Branislav Lečić gave five points to Bane Vidaković
 Edita Aradinović gave five points to Nenad Pagonis

Week 6
Guest Judge: Marija Šerifović   Aired: November 5, 2017  Winner: Mira Škorić

Bonus points
 Mira Škorić gave five points to Leon
 Dragana Mićalović gave five points to Mira Škorić
 Stevan Anđelković gave five points to Dragana Mićalović
 Leon gave five points to Mira Škorić
 Tijana Dapčević gave five points to Bebi Dol
 Bebi Dol gave five points to Mira Škorić
 Bane Vidaković gave five points to Tijana Dapčević
 Nenad Pagonis five points to Mira Škorić
 Branislav Lečić gave five points to Mira Škorić
 Edita Aradinović gave five points to Branislav Lečić

Week 7
Guest Judge: Aleksandar Milić Mili    Aired: November 12, 2017  Winner: Dragana Mićalović

Bonus points
 Mira Škorić gave five points to Dragana Mićalović
 Dragana Mićalović gave five points to Nenad Pagonis
 Stevan Anđelković gave five points to Branislav Lečić
 Leon gave five points to Branislav Lečić
 Tijana Dapčević gave five points to Mira Škorić
 Bebi Dol gave five points to Bane Vidaković
 Bane Vidaković gave five points to Dragana Mićalović
 Nenad Pagonis five points to Tijana Dapčević
 Branislav Lečić gave five points to Stevan Anđelković
 Edita Aradinović gave five points to Mira Škorić

Week 8 (Eurovision Night) 
Guest Judge:  Katarina Radivojević   Aired: November 19, 2017  Winner: Leon

Bonus points
 Mira Škorić gave five points to Leon
 Dragana Mićalović gave five points to Bane Vidaković
 Stevan Anđelković gave five points to Mira Škorić
 Leon gave five points to Bebi Dol
 Tijana Dapčević gave five points to Bane Vidaković
 Bebi Dol gave five points to Leon
 Bane Vidaković gave five points to Leon
 Nenad Pagonis five points to Leon
 Branislav Lečić gave five points to Leon
 Edita Aradinović gave five points to Leon

Week 9
Guest Judge:  Neda Arnerić   Aired: November 26, 2017  Winner: Stevan Anđelković

Bonus points

All contestants gave five points to Stevan Anđelković, while Stevan Anđelković gave five points to Tijana Dapčević.

Week 10
Guest Judge: Milutin Karadžić     Aired: December 3, 2017  Winner: Branislav Lečić

Bonus points
 Bane Vidaković gave five points to Branislav Lečić
 Nenad Pagonis gave five points to Branislav Lečić
 Stevan Anđelković gave five points to Branislav Lečić
 Mira Škorić gave five points to Branislav Lečić
 Leon gave five points to Bane Vidaković
 Dragana Mićalović gave five points to Branislav Lečić
 Branislav Lečić gave five points to Bane Vidaković
 Tijana Dapčević gave five points to Branislav Lečić
 Bebi Dol gave five points to Branislav Lečić
 Edita Aradinović gave five points to Bane Vidaković

Week 11 (Semi-final)
Guest Judge: Karolina Gočeva     Aired: December 10, 2017  Winner: Bane Vidaković

Bonus points
 Bane Vidaković gave five points to Nenad Pagonis
 Nenad Pagonis gave five points to Bane Vidaković
 Stevan Anđelković gave five points to Bane Vidaković
 Mira Škorić gave five points to Bane Vidaković
 Leon gave five points to Bane Vidaković
 Dragana Mićalović gave five points to Bane Vidaković
 Branislav Lečić gave five points to Bane Vidaković
 Tijana Dapčević gave five points to Branislav Lečić
 Bebi Dol gave five points to Nenad Pagonis
 Edita Aradinović gave five points to Nenad Pagonis

Week 12 (Final)

Aired: December 17, 2017  Guest Judge: Tonči Huljić     Series winner: Stevan Anđelković

Notes
1. Pagonis and Leon performed together.
2. Dragana and Branislav performed together.
3. Branislav and Bane performed together as Bruno Mars' and Anthony Kiedis' performance at the Super Bowl Halftime show. While the performance of the two bohemians (Toma & Cune) is considered the most emotional performance, the judges consider this performance to be the energetic, and humorous.
4. Dragana and Stevan performed together. This performance is considered to be one of the most emotional performances of the whole series.
5. Bebi and Mira performed together.
6. Stevan and Leon performed together.
7. Bebi and Bane performed together.
8. Pagonis and Mira performed together.
9. Edita, Leon and Pagonis performed together.
10. Tijana and Dragana performed together.
11. Stevan and Dragana performed together.
12. Bane and Edita performed together.
13. Edita and Stevan performed together.
14. Bebi, Tijana and Bane performed together.
15. The eight episode was the first episode that had a specific theme. The theme for the episode was Eurovision.
16. Bane and Mira performed together.
17. Stevan and Mira performed together.
18. Leon and Dragana performed together.
19. Stevan and Leon performed together. Stevan portrayed two different characters (Dan Reynolds and Ariana Grande), as well as Leon (Kendrick Lamar and Nicki Minaj).
20. Bebi, Bane and Mira performed together.
21. Andrija and Aleksandra performed together, although Andrija sang "Informer" by the Canadian reggae artist Snow before the duet.
22. Pagonis and Nina performed together.
23. Branko sang "Sex Bomb" using his parody lyrics.

References

Serbia
2017 Serbian television seasons